Sakon Nakhon Football Club (Thai สโมสรฟุตบอลจังหวัดสกลนคร), is a Thai semi professional football club based in Sakon Nakhon Province. The club currently plays in Thai League 3 Northeastern region.

Stadium and locations

Season by season record

P = Played
W = Games won
D = Games drawn
L = Games lost
F = Goals for
A = Goals against
Pts = Points
Pos = Final position

QR1 = First Qualifying Round
QR2 = Second Qualifying Round
R1 = Round 1
R2 = Round 2
R3 = Round 3
R4 = Round 4

R5 = Round 5
R6 = Round 6
QF = Quarter-finals
SF = Semi-finals
RU = Runners-up
W = Winners

Players

Current squad

References

External links 
 Official Website
 Official Facebookpage

Association football clubs established in 2005
Football clubs in Thailand
Sakon Nakhon province
2005 establishments in Thailand